William H. Taylor (July 18, 1863 – March 27, 1926) was a Vermont attorney, politician, and judge.  He was notable for his service as an associate justice of the Vermont Supreme Court from 1913 to 1926.

Early life
William Henry Taylor was born in Wheelock, Vermont on July 18, 1863, the son of Benjamin Franklin Taylor and Amanda M. (Stetson) Taylor.  He was raised in Wheelock and Hardwick, and graduated from Hardwick Academy in 1882.  He then attended Dartmouth College, from which he graduated in 1886.

Start of career
Taylor worked as a school teacher and administrator; he was principal of Hardwick Academy from 1886 to 1889, and school supervisor of Caledonia County from 1889 to 1891.  From 1891 to 1906, Taylor was Caledonia County's examiner of teachers.  He studied law with Henry Clay Ide and Wendell Phillips Stafford while working as an educator, and attained admission to the bar in 1892.  He practiced in Hardwick as the partner of Walter A. Dutton, who served as a judge of the Vermont Superior Court and a member of the Vermont Public Service Commission.

Continued career

A Republican, Taylor served in local offices including president of Hardwick's village trustees.  He was Caledonia County State's Attorney from 1894 to 1898.  From 1900 to 1901 he was a member of the Vermont House of Representatives.  From 1906 to 1907 he was a member of the Vermont Senate.

Career as judge
In 1906, Taylor was appointed a judge of the Vermont Superior Court.  He served until 1913, when he was appointed an associate justice of the Vermont Supreme Court.  Associate Justice George M. Powers had been appointed Chief Justice, and Taylor was named to the position vacated by Powers.

Taylor remained on the state Supreme Court until his death, and was succeeded by Frank L. Fish.

Death and burial
Taylor died at his son's home in Burlington on March 27, 1926.  He was buried at Hardwick Center Cemetery in Hardwick.

Family
In 1887, Taylor married Nettie I. Clark (1862-1930) of Hardwick.  They were the parents of four children—Harold F. (1890-1941), Florence Mary (1894-1985), Mildred I. (b. 1897), and Cecyle A. (1901-1981).

References

Sources

Books

Magazines

Newspapers

Internet

1863 births
1926 deaths
People from Caledonia County, Vermont
Dartmouth College alumni
U.S. state supreme court judges admitted to the practice of law by reading law
Vermont lawyers
State's attorneys in Vermont
Republican Party members of the Vermont House of Representatives
Republican Party Vermont state senators
Justices of the Vermont Supreme Court
Burials in Vermont
19th-century American lawyers